Auguste Broos (9 November 1894 – 18 October 1954) was a Belgian long-distance runner. He competed at the 1920 and 1924 Summer Olympics.

References

External links
 

1894 births
1954 deaths
Athletes (track and field) at the 1920 Summer Olympics
Athletes (track and field) at the 1924 Summer Olympics
Belgian male long-distance runners
Belgian male marathon runners
Olympic athletes of Belgium